Peter Bebb is a special effects artist best known for working on The Dark Knight trilogy.

He won at the 83rd Academy Awards for the film Inception in the category of Best Visual Effects. His win was shared with Chris Corbould, Paul Franklin and Andrew Lockley

Selected filmography

Terminator Genisys (2015)
Thor: The Dark World (2013)
The Dark Knight Rises (2012)
Captain America: The First Avenger (2011)
Inception (2010)
Prince of Persia: The Sands of Time (2010)
The Dark Knight (2008)
Inkheart (2008)
Batman Begins (2005)
Harry Potter and the Goblet of Fire (2005)
The Chronicles of Riddick (2004)
Die Another Day (2002)
Harry Potter and the Chamber of Secrets (2002)
Nutty Professor II: The Klumps (2000)
Pitch Black (2000)

References

External links

Living people
Best Visual Effects Academy Award winners
Best Visual Effects BAFTA Award winners
Special effects people
Year of birth missing (living people)